The 2016–17 Norfolk State Spartans men's basketball team represented Norfolk State University during the 2016–17 NCAA Division I men's basketball season. The Spartans, led by fourth-year coach Robert Jones, played their home games at the Joseph G. Echols Memorial Hall as members of the Mid-Eastern Athletic Conference. They finished the season 17–17, 12–4 in MEAC play to finish in second place. They defeated South Carolina State and Howard to advance to the championship game of the MEAC tournament where they lost to North Carolina Central. They were invited to the CollegeInsider.com Tournament, where they lost in the first round to Liberty.

Previous season
The Spartans finished the 2015–16 season 17–17, 12–4 in MEAC play to finish in a tie for second place. They defeated North Carolina Central in the quarterfinals of the MEAC tournament to advance to the semifinals where they lost to South Carolina State. The Spartans received an invitation to the CollegeInsider.com Tournament where they lost in the first round to Columbia.

Preseason 
The Spartans were picked to finish in fifth place in the preseason MEAC poll. Jordan Butler was named to the preseason All-MEAC third team.

Roster

Schedule and results

|-
!colspan=9 style="background:#; color:white;"| Exhibition

|-
!colspan=9 style="background:#; color:white;"| Non-conference regular season

|-
!colspan=9 style="background:#; color:white;"| MEAC regular season

|-
!colspan=9 style="background:#; color:white;"| MEAC tournament

|-
!colspan=9 style="background:#; color:white;"| CIT

References

Norfolk State Spartans men's basketball seasons
Norfolk State
Norfolk State
Norfolk State Spartans
Norfolk State Spartans